Felice Nova Noordhoff is a Dutch fashion model.

Early life 

Felice Nova Noordhoff was born in Alkmaar, North Holland, and raised in Bergen, North Holland. Her mother is Leontien Wenneker. She has one older brother and a younger sister. Noordhoff grew up playing sports and music. She played top-level field hockey and took singing lessons since she was 6 years old. Her family loves to travel and she developed her passion for foreign countries and cultures from a young age.

Career 

Noordhoff debuted as a Prada exclusive during the F/W 2017 season, at the age of 15. Her next season, she walked for Chanel, Louis Vuitton, Alexander McQueen, Dior, Dolce & Gabbana, Saint Laurent, Valentino, Fendi, Chloé, Max Mara, Moschino, JW Anderson, Versus, Simone Rocha, Mary Katrantzou, Alberta Ferretti, Missoni, Isabel Marant, Proenza Schouler, Versace and Paco Rabanne. She has also walked for Maison Margiela, Etro, Marc Jacobs, Tom Ford, Ralph Lauren, Carolina Herrera Calvin Klein and Off White. She was the Top Walker of PFW September 2018 and Top Walker MFW Feb & FW Sept 2019.

Noordhoff has appeared in editorials for Vogue Netherlands, Vogue Russia, Vogue Deutschland, Numéro, Holiday, Double, Self Service, Pop, Interview, and M le magazine du Monde. Noordhoff has appeared in campaigns for Givenchy, Valentino, Calvin Klein, Hermès, BOSS and Roberto Cavalli. In the Spring/Summer 2020 season, Noordhoff appeared in campaigns for Chloé by David Sims, Ralph Lauren and H&M both by Lachlan Bailey, and Alexander McQueen by Jamie Hawkesworth, followed by Dior, Etro, Ports by Steven Meisel. In 2021, Noordhoff again was the face of Ralph Lauren and Chloé for Spring/Summer and Autumn/Winter 2021 Burberry campaign, designed by Riccardo Tisci and shot by Mert & Marcus. Spring/Summer 2022, Noordhoff is the face of Ralph Lauren for the third time. 

Noordhoff ranks on the "Hot List" by models.com. Noordhoff entered the "Top 50 Models" ranking by models.com in October 2019. In December 2019, 
she was nominated in the category Breakout Star Women at models.com's Model of the Year Awards. Noordhoff has walked 293 fashion shows since she started her debut.

References 

Living people
2001 births
Dutch female models
People from Alkmaar
Women Management models
Prada exclusive models